Crossmaheart is a 1998 British drama film directed by Henry Herbert and starring Gerard Rooney, Maria Lennon and Enda Oates. It was based on the 1995 novel Cycle of Violence by Colin Bateman. It was released as Dead Man's Girl on DVD in the US, but didn't go on general release in the UK.

Cast
 Gerard Rooney as Kevin Miller
 Maria Lennon as Marie
 Enda Oates as O'Hagan
 Des Cave as Sergeant Craig
 Seamus Ball as Father
 Paula McFetridge as Fiona
 Richard Orr as Dave Morrow
 Conleth Hill as Coulter
 Tim Loane as Reverend Rainty
 Alan McKee as Curly Bap
 Doreen Keogh as Mrs. Hardy
 John Keegan as Callaghan
 Peter Ballance as Johnny
 Catherine Brennan as Helen
 Patrick Fitzsymons as Galvin
 David Bateman as Drunk dancing on a table

References

External links
 

1998 films
1998 drama films
Films directed by Henry Herbert
British drama films
Films based on British novels
1990s English-language films
1990s British films